Junuy Juluum  is a national park located in New South Wales, Australia,  northeast of Sydney.

Positioned on the slopes of Campion Mountain, this remnant of warm temperate rainforest is a haven for paradise riflebirds and sooty owls.

The average elevation of the terrain is 743 meters.

See also
 Protected areas of New South Wales

References

External links
 National Parks NSW

National parks of New South Wales
Protected areas established in 1999
1999 establishments in Australia